The fourth season of The Twilight Zone aired Thursdays at 9:00–10:00 pm on CBS from January 3 to May 23, 1963.

This season broke with the previous seasons in presenting hour-long episodes instead of the earlier half-hour episodes. The opening sequence was revamped, and introduces the now-iconic floating door, smashed window, clock, eyeball, wooden doll, and the equation for Einstein's theory of relativity. Rod Serling's narration was also changed from the earlier seasons as well:

"You unlock this door with the key of imagination. Beyond it is another dimension. A dimension of sound. A dimension of sight. A dimension of mind. You're moving into a land of both shadow and substance, of things and ideas. You've just crossed over into the Twilight Zone."

An intermission graphic based on this opening was used for the fourth and fifth seasons as well.

Episodes

References

 

1963 American television seasons
59 series